The 1980–81 Arkansas Razorbacks men's basketball team represented the University of Arkansas during the 1980–81 NCAA Division I men's basketball season.

Roster
Craig Olson
U.S. Reed

Schedule and results

Rankings

References

Arkansas Razorbacks men's basketball seasons
Arkansas
Arkansas
1980 in sports in Arkansas
1981 in sports in Arkansas